Haokip is a surname of Thadou/Kuki origin. Notable people with the surname include:

Yamthong Haokip, Indian politician and MLA from Saikul
Paokai Haokip, Indian politician and former Member of Parliament in the 4th Lok Sabha, 1967-70
Holkhomang Haokip, Indian politician and former Minister of Manipur and Member of Parliament during the 13th Lok Sabha
Ngamthang Haokip, Indian politician and former Minister of Manipur
T Thangzalam Haokip, Indian politician, Chairman, Hill Areas Committee of Manipur
Letpao Haokip, Indian politician, and Minister for Irrigation and Flood Control (IFC) of Manipur
T N Haokip (born 1964), Indian politician and president of the Manipur Pradesh Congress Committee
Paolienlal Haokip, Indian politician and MLA from Saikot
Letzamang Haokip, Indian politician and MLA from Henglep
Boithang Haokip (born 1991), Indian footballer
Thongkhosiem Haokip (born 1993), Indian footballer
T S Haokip, Columnist, and author of the book Hilly Dreams
Themneihat Haokip, Indian actress